Ochota is a district of Warsaw, Poland, located in the central part of the Polish capital city's urban agglomeration. It is the city's most densely populated district and home to the scientific campus of the University of Warsaw.

The biggest housing estates of Ochota are:
 Kolonia Lubeckiego
 Kolonia Staszica
 Filtry
 Rakowiec
 Szosa Krakowska
 Szczęśliwice
 Osiedle Oaza

Neighbourhoods within the district
 Stara Ochota
 Filtry
 Rakowiec
 Szczęśliwice

See also 
 Ochota massacre
 Warsaw Icon Museum

References

External links